Silverbell Lake is located in Christopher Columbus Park in western Tucson, east of Silverbell Road between Camino del Cerro and Grant Roads, in the U.S. state of Arizona.

Fish species
 Rainbow trout
 Largemouth bass
 Smallmouth bass
 Sunfish
 Channel catfish
 Carp

References

External links
 Silverbell Lake
 Video of Silverbell Lake

Reservoirs in Pima County, Arizona
Geography of Tucson, Arizona
Tourist attractions in Tucson, Arizona
Reservoirs in Arizona